Ximena or Jimena is the female version of the given name Jimeno or Ximeno, a Spanish or Basque name of unknown meaning that has been in use since the Middle Ages. It has been associated with the Basque Semen. It has come to be viewed as a form of the name Simone, though their origins are distinct.  The French rendering of the name is Chimène.

It is currently among the most popular names for baby girls in Mexico. In 2020, it was the 129st most popular name for girls born in the United States.

Notes 

Feminine given names